The Belltower of the Maryborough Fire Station in Maryborough, Victoria was built in 1888, and is important as one of a small group of fire station towers erected in Victoria. It is an example of a rare building type, essential to the nineteenth century city, made redundant by the advent of electric communications.

The design of the brick part of the tower is eclectic, with a wide arched base, battered walls, diagonally placed windows, and an Italianate arcaded belfry. This is topped by a most unusual, very tall timber superstructure.

The Belltower is attached to the fire station which was built in 1861, and now used as the Maryborough Art Gallery.

The belltower is listed on the Register of the National Estate and was classified at the Regional level in 1975 by the National Trust of Australia (Victoria).

References

Fire stations in Victoria (Australia)
Victorian Heritage Register